In fluid dynamics, the Burgers vortex or Burgers–Rott vortex is an exact solution to the Navier–Stokes equations governing viscous flow, named after Jan Burgers and Nicholas Rott. The Burgers vortex describes a stationary, self-similar flow.
An inward, radial flow, tends to concentrate vorticity in a narrow column around the symmetry axis. At the same time, viscous diffusion tends to spread the vorticity. The stationary Burgers vortex arises when the two effects balance.

The Burgers vortex, apart from serving as an illustration of the vortex stretching mechanism, may describe such flows as tornados, where the vorticity is provided by continuous convection-driven vortex stretching.

Flow field 

The flow for the Burgers vortex is described in cylindrical  coordinates. Assuming axial symmetry (no -dependence), the flow field associated with the axisymmetric stagnation point flow is considered:

The flow satisfies the continuity equation by the two first of the above equations. The azimuthal momentum equation of the Navier-Stokes equations then reduces to 

where  is the kinematic viscosity of the fluid. The equation is integrated with the condition  so that at infinity the solution behaves like a potential vortex, but at finite location, the flow is rotational. The choice  ensures  at the axis. The solution is

The vorticity equation only gives a non-trivial component in the -direction, given by

The first term on the right-hand side of the above equation corresponds to vortex stretching which intensifies the vorticity of the vortex core due to the axial-velocity component . The intensified vorticity tries to diffuse outwards radially due to the second term on the right-hand side, but is prevented by radial vorticity convection due to  that emerges on the left-hand side of the above equation. The three-way balance establishes a steady solution. The Burgers vortex is a stable solution of the Navier-Stokes equations.

Kambe's unsteady solution
In 1984, Tsutomu Kambe provided an exact solution of the time dependent Navier Stokes equations for arbitrary function . In particular, when  is constant, the vorticity field  with an arbitrary initial distribution  is given by

As , the asymptotic behaviour is given by

Thus, provided , an arbitrary vorticity distribution approaches the Burgers' vortex. If , say in the case where the initial condition is composed of two equal and opposite vortices, then the first term is zero and the second term implies that vorticity decays to zero as

Burgers vortex layer

Burgers vortex layer or Burgers vortex sheet is a strained shear layer, which is a two-dimensional analogue of Burgers vortex. This is also an exact solution of the Navier-Stokes equations, first described by A. A. Townsend in 1951. The velocity field  expressed in the Cartesian coordinates are

The value  is interpreted as the vortex sheet strength. The vorticity equation only gives a non-trivial component in the -direction, given by

The Burgers vortex sheet is shown to be unstable to small disturbances by K. N. Beronov and S. Kida thereby undergoing Kelvin–Helmholtz instability initially, followed by second instabilities and possibly transitioning to Kerr-Dold vortices.

Non-axisymmetric Burgers vortices
Non-axisymmetric Burgers' vortices emerge in non-axisymmetric strained flows. The structure of non-axisymmetric Burgers' vortices for arbitrary values of vortex Reynolds number can be discussed through numerical integrations. The velocity field takes the form

subjected to the condition . The vortex cross-section lies in  plane, providing a non-zero vorticity component in the  direction

Burgers vortex in cylindrical stagnation surfaces
Explicit solution of the Navier-Stokes equations for the Burgers vortex in stretched cylindrical stagnation surfaces was solved by P. Rajamanickam and A. D. Weiss. The solution is expressed in the cylindrical coordinate system as follows

This solution is nothing but the Burger's vortex in the presence of a line source with source strength . The vorticity equation only gives a non-trivial component in the -direction, given by

where  in the above expression is the gamma function. Explicit solution for Sullivan vortex in cylindrical stagnation surface also exists.

Sullivan vortex
In 1959, Roger D. Sullivan extended the Burgers vortex solution by considering the solution of the form

where .

See also
Kerr–Dold vortex

References

Fluid dynamics